The Jamaica United Front was a political party in Jamaica.

It was a right wing small party and was first noticed when in 1980 it proposed a national unity government of the Jamaica Labour Party and the People's National Party.

They were involved in an attempted coup on June 23, 1980.  The leader, Charles Johnson, had been a member of the United States Army, serving in Vietnam and was running a security company in Kingston.  The coup was seen by the left as a plot by the CIA and by the Jamaican Labour Party (which had not been involved) as an excuse to bring in troops from Cuba prior to elections.  Johnson was acquitted in 1981 when a witness was judged to be unreliable.

It contested one seat in the 1983 Jamaican general election. The elections that year saw a mass boycott (turnout was just 2.7%) as the People's National Party protested against the government. The JUF received only 144 votes and failed to win a seat. It did not contest any further elections.

References

Defunct political parties in Jamaica